Phreatia paleata, commonly known as the white lace orchid, is a plant in the orchid family and is an epiphyte with more or less spherical pseudobulbs, each with one or two leathery leaves. A large number of white flowers are arranged along a drooping flowering stem. It is native to areas between Sulawesi and the southwest Pacific.

Description
The sepals and petals are elliptic to egg-shaped and spread widely apart from each other. Flowering occurs between January and April.

Taxonomy and naming
The white lace orchid was first formally described in 1877 by Heinrich Gustav Reichenbach who gave it the name Eria paleata and published the description in the journal Linnaea. In that journal Reichenbach had suggested the name Phreatia paleata and in 1911 Friedrich Wilhelm Ludwig Kraenzlin formalised the name. The specific epithet (paleata) is derived from the Latin word palea meaning "chaff".

Distribution and habitat
Phreatia paleata usually grows on rainforest trees in Sulawesi, the Bismarck Archipelago, New Guinea, the Solomon Islands, Norfolk Island, Fiji, New Caledonia, Samoa and Vanuatu.

Conservation status
This orchid is classed as "endangered" on Norfolk Island under the Australian Government Environment Protection and Biodiversity Conservation Act 1999. The main threats to the species are its small population size and changes to the hydrology of the forest where it grows.

References

paleata
Plants described in 1876
Flora of Norfolk Island
Orchids of New Caledonia
Orchids of Papua New Guinea
Orchids of Indonesia
Orchids of the Solomon Islands
Orchids of Vanuatu